Artuz v. Bennett, 531 U.S. 4 (2000), was a unanimously-decided United States Supreme Court case. The case concerned whether a habeas corpus petition tolled for time under the Antiterrorism and Effective Death Penalty Act of 1996 when certain state claims are still pending. The Court held that the petition did not toll.

Facts 
The petitioner, Bennett, was convicted of attempted murder after shooting at police. In 1995, Bennett moved pro se to vacate his conviction, which was denied orally by a New York court. Bennett claimed that he never received a copy of a written order reflecting the denial. In 1998, Bennett filed a federal habeas corpus petition alleging violations of his rights to present witnesses in his defense and to a fair trial, to be present at all material stages of the trial, and to the effective assistance of counsel. The Federal District Court dismissed Bennett's federal habeas corpus petition as untimely under the Antiterrorism and Effective Death Penalty Act of 1996 (AEDPA), which set a 1-year period of limitation on federal habeas corpus applications by state prisoners. The Court of Appeals found that the habeas corpus petition was not time barred due to Bennett not receiving a written order from his 1995 claim.

Opinion 
Justice Scalia delivered the unanimous decision for the Court, which held that an application for postconviction relief containing procedurally barred claims is properly filed within the meaning of the Antiterrorism and Effective Death Penalty Act of 1996. Only the specific claims and not the actual filing of the claims could be defaulted under state law, he argued. "An application is 'filed', as that term is commonly understood," Scalia wrote, "when it is delivered to, and accepted by, the appropriate state officer for placement into the official record". In the present case, the Court had not issued a written dismissal, just an oral decision from the bench. That would not count toward the tolling of the habeas claim.

See also
 Habeas corpus
 Death penalty

References

External links

United States Supreme Court cases
United States Supreme Court cases of the Rehnquist Court
2000 in United States case law
United States habeas corpus case law